Ivan Jones may refer to:

 Ivan Jones (author), British writer
 Ivan Jones (rugby league), Australian rugby league player
 Boogaloo Joe Jones (Ivan Joseph Jones), jazz guitarist
 Ivan Jones (Emmerdale), a character on the British soap opera Emmerdale
 Ivan Jones (British Army officer), British general